Rita Long Visitor Holy Dance is a Native American spiritual elder who is a member of the Oglala Lakota Tribe and comes from the Pine Ridge Reservation in South Dakota. Through her work as an indigenous elder stateswoman, Rita has gained international recognition through her work as part of the International Council of 13 Indigenous Grandmothers - a group of spiritual elders, medicine women and wisdom keepers since its founding in 2004.

Personal
Her older sister Beatrice waited for Rita to wed and they enjoyed a double wedding. She is a descendant of Long Visitor, and a member of the Crazy Horse Band. She works with a youth ambassador program for Lakota youth that connects them with their spiritual traditions, including the Sun Dance, and works to free youth from substance abuse. She has taught at the Omega Institute for Holistic Studies.

The International Council of 13 Grandmothers

In 2004, Rita was approached by The Center for Sacred Studies to serve on the International Council of 13 Indigenous Grandmothers.

Notes

References 
Chittister, J, April 24, 2009, Blog on National Catholic Reporter website, The past is a very living thing: Try not to forget it. 
Grandmothers' Council website about the Grandmothers 
 Native Village Publications,  
Sacred Studies, Grandmother's Biographies. 
Schaefer, C, (2006) Grandmothers Council the World: wise women elders offer their vision for our planet. Trumpeter Books 978-1-59030-293-4

External links 
 International Council of 13 of Indigenous Grandmothers Official Website
 Official website for documentary
 For The Next Seven Generations Film Trailer
 The Center for Sacred Studies
Statement of the International Council of Thirteen Indigenous Grandmothers
 

American humanitarians
Women humanitarians
American environmentalists
American women environmentalists
Female Native American leaders
Native American activists
Religious figures of the indigenous peoples of North America
Living people
Sustainability advocates
People from the Pine Ridge Indian Reservation, South Dakota
Oglala people
Year of birth missing (living people)
21st-century American women
20th-century Native American women
20th-century Native Americans
21st-century Native American women
21st-century Native Americans